Biscayne may refer to:

 Biscayne, an ethnonym and demonym meaning a Basque or hailing from the seigniory or province of Biscay.
 Biscayne language, an early modern synonym for the Basque language.

Places

Belize
Biscayne, Belize, a village in the Belize district.

South Florida
 Key Biscayne, an island in Miami-Dade County
 Key Biscayne, Florida, a village on Key Biscayne island
 Biscayne Bay, a lagoon on the Atlantic coast, bounded in part by Key Biscayne
 Biscayne Aquifer, a body of permeable rock 
 Biscayne Boulevard, a section of highway US-1
 Camp Biscayne, a winter resort in Coconut Grove, 1903-1925
 Biscayne Island, Miami Beach, Florida, westernmost of the Venetian Islands in Biscayne Bay
 Biscayne Landing, a mixed use commercial/hotel/residential community being developed in North Miami 
 Biscayne National Park, a U.S. National Park 
 Biscayne Park, Florida, a village in Miami-Dade County

Other uses
 Chevrolet Biscayne, a series of automobiles.
 USS Biscayne (AVP-11), a United States Navy seaplane tender in commission from 1941 to 1946

See also
 Biscayan, dialect of Basque